Post-exertional malaise (PEM), sometimes referred to as post-exertional symptom exacerbation (PESE), is a worsening of chronic fatigue syndrome or long COVID symptoms that occurs after exertion. PEM is often severe enough to be disabling, and is triggered by ordinary activities that healthy people tolerate. Typically, it begins 12–48 hours after the activity that triggers it, and lasts for days, but this is highly variable. Management of PEM is symptomatic, and patients are recommended to pace their activities to avoid triggering PEM.

Description 

Post-exertional malaise involves an exacerbation of symptoms, often severely enough to impact a person's functioning. While fatigue is often prominent, it is "more than fatigue following a stressor." Other symptoms that may occur during PEM include cognitive impairment, flu-like symptoms, pain, weakness, and trouble sleeping. Despite being typically cast as a worsening of existing symptoms, patients may experience some symptoms exclusively during PEM. Patients often describe PEM as "crash," "relapse," or "setback."

PEM is triggered by "minimal" physical or mental activities that were previously tolerated, and that healthy people tolerate, like attending a social event, grocery shopping, or even taking a shower. Emotional distress, injury, sleep deprivation, infections, and spending too long standing or sitting up are other as potential triggers. The resulting symptoms are disproportionate to the triggering activity and are often debilitating, potentially rendering someone housebound or bedbound until they recover.

The course of a crash is highly variable. Symptoms typically begin 12–48 hours after the triggering activity, but may be immediate, or delayed up to 7 days. PEM lasts "usually a day or longer," but can span hours, days, weeks, or months. The level of activity that triggers PEM, as well as the symptoms, vary from person to person, and within individuals over time. Due to this variability, affected people may be unable to predict what will trigger it. This variable, relapsing-remitting pattern can cause one's abilities to fluctuate from one day to the next.

Diagnosis 
PEM is a common symptom of both ME/CFS and long Covid.

Its presence can be difficult to assess because patients and doctors may be unfamiliar with it. Hence, the WHO recommends that clinicians explicitly ask long COVID patients whether symptoms worsen with activity.

The 2-day Cardiopulmonary Exercise Test (CPET) may aid in documenting PEM, showing apparent abnormalities in the body's response to exercise. Still, more research on developing a diagnostic test is needed.

Epidemiology 
Depending on the definition of ME/CFS used, PEM is present in 60 to 100% of ME/CFS patients. PEM is considered a cardinal symptom by some diagnostic criteria: the International Consensus Criteria, the National Academy of Medicine criteria, and NICE's definition of CFS all require it. The Canadian Consensus Criteria require "post exertional malaise and/or [post exertional] fatigue" instead. On the other hand, the older Oxford Criteria lack any mention of PEM, and the Fukuda Criteria consider it optional.

Studies have found that a majority of people with long COVID experience post-exertional malaise as well.

Management 

There is no treatment or cure for PEM. Pacing, a management strategy in which someone plans their activities to stay within their limits, may help avoid triggering PEM.

Physical therapy for people with long COVID must be modified to avoid triggering PEM in susceptible patients.

References

Chronic fatigue syndrome
Symptoms